Ulf Hamrin, born on 11 June 1946 in Östersund, Sweden is a Swedish writer and copywriter.

Bibliography 
 Energi är livet! co-writer Tommy Ericsson (1991)	  
 Nyfiken på energi co-writer Hans-Uno Bengtsson (2000)
 Nätchocken (2001)
 Smakbitar: mat och musik från Jämtland och Härjedalen (2002)
 Tankar om döden illustrated by Lars-Erik Håkansson – Lehån (2002)
 Tankar om livet illustrated by Lars-Erik Håkansson – Lehån (2003)
 Tankar om tiden illustrated by Lars-Erik Håkansson (2003)
 Drömfabriken (2006)
 Jämtland, Härjedalen: ett sätt att leva co-writer Claes Ahlström and Jenny Isaksson (2010)
 Bilden, first part of the trilogy ”Jag finns inte” Visto förlag (2015)

References

1946 births
Living people
Swedish male writers
21st-century Swedish writers